Seald Sweet International is a citrus marketing company based out of Vero Beach, Florida, founded in 1909 as the Florida Citrus Exchange and currently owned by Greenyard USA, with which it merged in 1998.

Seald Sweet was founded in 1909 as The Florida Citrus Exchange, a grower-owned cooperative and Florida’s oldest and largest fresh citrus marketing company. In 1959, in celebration of the grower-owned cooperative's 50th anniversary, the Florida Citrus Exchange officially became Seald Sweet Growers, Inc.

References

Companies based in Florida